de Lima or d'Lima is a Portuguese and Italian surname. It is also a Spanish name meaning "of Lima". It is also an Indian surname, named for the converts when the Portuguese occupied India.

Delima is a Malay word for pomegranate and is also a family name in the Philippines, Malaysia and Indonesia. 

Notable people with the surname include:

 Ronaldo Luís Nazário de Lima, Real Madrid and Brazilian footballer
 Vanderlei de Lima, a Brazilian athlete
 Augusto de Lima, a Brazilian journalist
 Vicente de Lima, a Brazilian athlete
 Jorge de Lima, a Brazilian writer and politician
 Afonso Henriques de Lima Barreto, a Brazilian author
 Leila de Lima, a Filipino former senator and Secretary of Justice
 Frank De Lima, an American comedian
 Sri Delima, also known as Adibah Amin, a Malaysian writer
 Shannon de Lima, a Venezuelan model and actress, former wife of singer Marc Anthony

See also
 Ponte de Lima, a municipality in Portugal
 Santa Rosa de Lima (disambiguation), several places with this name
 Universidad de Lima, University of Lima, Peru
 Seri Delima (state constituency) in Penang, Malaysia
 Sri Delima station, in Kuala Lumpur, Malaysia
 DeLima v. Bidwell, U.S. Supreme Court case
 Pengiran Siraja Muda Delima Satu, a neighbourhood in Bandar Seri Begawan, Brunei
 Pancha Delima, Brunei, neighbourhood in Bandar Seri Begawan, Brunei
 Dalima, a genus of moths
 Dilemma (disambiguation)
 Lima (surname)

References

Portuguese-language surnames
Italian-language surnames